Meshack R. Roberts was enslaved, worked as a blacksmith, became a minister in the Methodist church, and served as state legislator and Republican Party official in Texas.

His slaveowner, O. B. Roberts moved him to Gilmer, Texas in 1844. He was a caretaker of Roberts family during the American Civil War and Roberts gave him and his family some land and materials for a log cabin after the war. Two years later he was attacked and left for dead by the Ku Klux Klan in Gilmer, and moved to Marshall, Texas after recovering.

In Marshall, he worked as a blacksmith and was a Methodist minister. He won a seat in the state legislature in the 1873 election to the Thirteenth Legislature as a representative for the Fifth District including Rusk County, Texas and Harrison County, Texas, succeeding Mitchell Kendall. He won two subsequent terms in office, the last for the Tenth District, representing Harrison County. The Citizen's Party of Harrison County came to power in a disputed 1878 election as Democrats increasingly regained control after the Reconstruction era ended and restored white supremacy.

Illiterate, he was known for his speeches in the "camp meeting" style and being clear, logical and irresistible. He signed documents with an X. He was also a preacher and with his church helped establish Wiley College. He was recorded as having a wife and daughter.

He was honored by the 79th Texas Legislature in 2005, along with other early African-American legislators, for their service to Texas.

See also
African-American officeholders during and following the Reconstruction era

References

Republican Party members of the Texas House of Representatives
Year of birth missing
Year of death missing
19th-century American slaves
American Methodists
American blacksmiths
People from Rusk County, Texas
People from Harrison County, Texas
People from Upshur County, Texas
African Americans in Texas
Reconstruction Era